Hans B. Schmidt (1881 – February 18, 1916) was a German Catholic priest, rapist, convicted murderer, and suspected serial killer. He was executed at Sing Sing Prison in New York for murdering a woman in the United States. Schmidt remains the only Catholic priest in American history to face capital punishment.

Early life

Hans Schmidt was born in the Bavarian town of Aschaffenburg, to a Protestant father and a Catholic mother. Both sides of his family had a long history of mental illness. From his early childhood, Hans was regularly beaten by his father and watched his father beating his mother. Even in childhood, Schmidt combined a deep religious devotion with bisexual promiscuity and a fascination with drinking blood and dismembering animals. According to relatives, Hans once beheaded two of his parents' geese and kept the severed heads in his pocket. He also frequented the village slaughterhouse daily, where he would watch the death and dissection of farm animals with rapt fascination. During his later seminary studies, Schmidt was arrested by the Bavarian police  in 1905 and charged with forging diplomas for failing students. Although the public prosecutor of Mainz was determined to send Schmidt to prison, his father  hired a lawyer who arranged for the charges to be dropped for reasons of mental defect.

Ordination

Although many who knew him had serious doubts about his moral and mental fitness to serve as a Catholic priest, Schmidt claimed that he was ordained by Bishop Kirstein of Mainz on December 23, 1904. In a later conversation with Manhattan alienists, he recalled, "The Bishop ordained me alone. I do not like to speak of it. The real Ordination took place the night before. St. Elizabeth, she ordained me herself. I was praying at my bedside when she appeared to me and said, 'I ordain you to the priesthood.' There was light during her appearance. I told no one. I thought it best to keep it to myself. They would make fun of me. They always made fun of me for these things. They always expect others to do as they do. God speaks to different people in different ways."

During parish assignments in the villages of Bürgel and Seelingstädt, Schmidt molested altar boys, had affairs with several women, and consorted with prostitutes. Meanwhile, Schmidt's creative way of saying Mass and eccentric sermons led his parishioners and fellow priests to complain about him to the monsignor and the bishop. When it became clear that no further parish assignments would be forthcoming in  the Diocese of Mainz, Schmidt emigrated to the United States in 1909. He was first assigned to St. John's Roman Catholic Church in Louisville, Kentucky. There, a rift with the senior pastor resulted in Schmidt's transfer to St. Boniface's Church in New York City.

Anna Aumüller

In New York City in 1912, Schmidt met Anna Aumüller, the housekeeper at the Rectory of St. Boniface's Church, who had emigrated from the Austro-Hungarian Empire in 1910. In his conversations with alienists, Schmidt claimed to have heard a voice from God ordering him to "love" Anna. She first refused his advances, but eventually began having a secret sexual relationship with Schmidt.

Beginning in December 1912, Schmidt was also having a secret homosexual relationship with a New York City dentist named Ernest Muret, with whom he operated a counterfeiting ring. Schmidt later claimed to have enjoyed Muret more than Anna.

Despite his subsequent transfer to St. Joseph's Church in Harlem, Schmidt and Anna continued a secret sexual relationship. It was later revealed that they were "married" in a secret ceremony, which Schmidt performed himself. Schmidt also wrote their names on a marriage certificate and told Anna that he was about to leave the priesthood for her.

During a sexual encounter with Anna on the high altar of St. Joseph's Church, Schmidt received what he claimed was a command from God to "sacrifice" her. The command was repeated so insistently that Schmidt told Anna, who called him "crazy". Soon after, Anna informed him that she was pregnant.

On the night of September 2, 1913, Schmidt went to the apartment they had rented while posing as a married couple. He slashed Anna's throat while she slept, drank her blood, raped her as she bled to death, dismembered her body, and threw the pieces from a ferry into the Hudson River. Schmidt then returned to St. Joseph's Church, offered Mass and administered Holy Communion as though nothing had happened.

Police investigation
After pieces of Anna's torso washed ashore at Cliffside Park and Weehawken, New Jersey, Hudson County police detectives found a price tag still attached to the pillowcase used to wrap part of the body. Using the tag, the pillowcase was traced to a Newark factory, which sold exclusively to Manhattan furniture dealer George Sachs. The investigation was then taken over by the New York City Police Department and assigned to Manhattan Chief of Detectives Joseph Faurot.

After arriving at George Sachs' furniture store at 2782 Eighth Avenue, Inspector Faurot found the dealer unable to recall how many of the pillowcases he had sold. A check through his receipts revealed that a bedspring, a mattress, pillows, and pillowcases had been sold on August 26, 1913. The buyer had given his name as A. Van Dyke and had arranged for his purchases to be delivered to a third story apartment at 68 Bradhurst Avenue.

Questions to the building superintendent revealed that apartment was occupied by a married couple. The husband was described as a man with a heavy German accent who had given his name as H. Schmidt. When a three-day stake out revealed no one arriving, Inspector Faurot ordered detective Frank Cassassa to break into the apartment. A cursory search found that the floor had been recently scrubbed, but large amounts of dried blood were found on the walls. A large bloodstained knife was also found on the kitchen shelf. Men's clothing with the name A. Van Dyke sewn into the lining was found, as were letters in both German and English addressed to a Hans Schmidt.

Many of the letters were from women in Germany. The largest number, however, were from an Anna Aumüller whose most recent address was listed as 428 East Seventieth Street. Inspector Faurot and detectives Cassassa and O'Connell visited the address and learned that Anna had moved out after receiving a job as housekeeper at St. Boniface's Church. Faurot and the detectives then visited St. Boniface's Church and were told by the senior pastor, Fr. John Braun, that Anna had been his housekeeper, but had transferred to St. Joseph's Church. Upon being asked if he knew the name Hans Schmidt, Fr. Braun described him as a priest who had formerly been assigned to St. Boniface's Church but had also moved to St. Joseph's.

Inspector Faurot and detectives Cassassa and O'Connell arrived at St. Joseph's Rectory at 1:30. After Faurot pounded on the door, the senior pastor, Fr. Daniel Quinn, opened the door, led them into the parlor, and woke Schmidt. Upon being confronted by the inspector and the detectives, Schmidt admitted, "I killed her! I killed her because I loved her!" Schmidt then described the murder and dismemberment in detail. As his fellow priests watched in horror, Schmidt was taken into police custody.

Trials, appeals, and execution

A media spectacle ensued, as the New York papers competed against each other with an ever greater degree of sensationalism regarding the case.

Following his arrest, the Archdiocese of New York announced that Fr. Schmidt's priestly faculties had been indefinitely suspended.

During Schmidt's first trial, Schmidt feigned insanity. On top of his defense team using Schmidt's claims of hearing voices to try to convince the jury of their client's insanity, the defense also claimed that insanity ran in Schmidt's family. They called one witness, a psychologist named Smith Ely Jeliffe, to testify that Schmidt's family tree showed up to sixty near or distant relatives who displayed signs of mental instability, and therefore, Schmidt could not be put to death because he, too, was insane. The prosecution called in other witnesses, including doctors, who had examined Schmidt while he awaited trial and concluded that contrary to his efforts to convince authorities otherwise, and contrary to Schmidt's ramblings about voices telling him to commit murder against Aumüller, Schmidt was sane. However, the prosecution's efforts were in vain; at the conclusion of the trial in December 1913, the jury could not come to a decision after deliberating for several days, so he had a hung jury.

The second trial occurred approximately two weeks later. This time, however, the prosecution introduced testimony that, in April 1913; well before Fr Schmidt received his alleged command from God to "sacrifice" Anna, Fr. Schmidt had convinced a woman named Bertha Zech to pose as Anna Aumüller and to purchase a $5000 life insurance policy under her name. The policy listed Fr. Schmidt as the sole beneficiary.

On February 5, 1914, after three hours of deliberation, a jury found Fr. Schmidt guilty of first-degree murder. He was sentenced to death. After being sentenced, Fr. Schmidt said "I'm satisfied with the verdict. I would rather die today than tomorrow." He was sent to Sing Sing Prison to await execution.

Schmidt's defense team filed an appeal shortly after his sentence, which postponed his execution for at least a year while it worked its way through the courts. In December 1914, Schmidt admitted that he feigned insanity during his trials. In admitting so, however, he also pinned the murder on the dentist with whom he had a homosexual affair, Ernest Muret. Dr. Muret, Schmidt alleged, had accidentally killed Anna during a botched abortion. Fr. Schmidt further claimed that he allowed authorities to pursue him for the murder rather than Muret because he wanted to cover for his friend.

Schmidt's appeals were ultimately unsuccessful. On the early morning of February 18, 1916, Fr. Schmidt entered the death chamber at 5:50 AM. Moments before being seated in the  electric chair, Fr. Schmidt said, "I want to say one word before I go. I beg forgiveness of all I have offended or scandalized and I forgive all who have offended against me!"

Moments before the switch was thrown, Fr. Schmidt said in a muffled voice, "My last word is to say goodbye to my dear old mother!"

The first jolt of electricity was initiated at 5:52 AM. After two additional jolts were administered, the prison physical pronounced Fr. Hans Schmidt dead at 5:58 AM.

A reporter for the Albany Times later wrote, "His last night on earth he spent proclaiming his innocence and declaring that he had made peace with God. The guards had expected a scene when the slayer was to be executed. But his actions surprised them. He was the coolest man in the death chamber. He almost domineered those who assisted in putting him to death."

The Schmidt family had originally intended to ship Fr. Schmidt's body home to Germany. However, due to the ongoing nature of World War I, this proved impossible. As a result, Fr. William Cashin, the Sing Sing prison Roman Catholic chaplain, arranged for burial in New York State. At the request of Fr. Schmidt's family in Germany, the location of his burial was kept secret.

Other possible crimes

Apart from killing his young, pregnant "wife", further investigation revealed that Schmidt had a second apartment where he had set up a counterfeiting workshop.

Authorities suspected Schmidt of as many as four other murders. He had been seen with a woman named Helen Green. Green left for Chicago the month before Anna's murder, but had then disappeared. Police couldn't find any traces of Green. When he moved to America, Schmidt was seen with another woman whom he claimed was his wife. She had since disappeared.

Schmidt was suspected in the deaths of two children. The owner of the apartment complex where Schmidt was living said she sometimes brought a 5-year-old boy to his living room. Schmidt claimed the boy was his son. That boy had since disappeared. When the woman asked the boy for his name, he said it was August Van Dyke.

Schmidt became an alternate suspect in the murder of Alma Kellner (aged 9) whose body was found buried in the basement of St. John's church in Louisville, Kentucky, where he had previously worked. The body had been burned, but authorities suspected the killer had initially tried to dismember her. The janitor, Joseph Wendling, was convicted and sentenced to life in prison for the murder based on circumstantial evidence and bloody clothing found at his house. Upon the request of Alma's uncle, Wendling was pardoned and deported to his home country of France in 1935.

References

Further reading

External links
Hans B. Schmidt from the Library of Congress at Flickr

1881 births
1916 deaths
Dismemberments
20th-century executions by New York (state)
20th-century executions of American people
20th-century American Roman Catholic priests
American members of the clergy convicted of crimes
American people executed for murder
Catholic priests convicted of murder
Executed Roman Catholic priests
German people convicted of murder
German people executed abroad
People executed by New York (state) by electric chair
People convicted of murder by New York (state)
1913 murders in the United States
1913 in New York (state)
LGBT Roman Catholic priests
German LGBT people
Bisexual men
Suspected serial killers